Oxygymnocypris stewartii is a species of cyprinid fish endemic to Tibet and occurs in the Yarlung Tsangpo River  (=upper Brahmaputra) and its tributaries at altitudes above  in the Qinghai-Tibet Plateau. It is the only species in its genus.

Life history and ecology
It is a long-lived (to 25 years), late-maturing species that reproduces annually.

Oxygymnocypris stewartii inhabits the deeper areas of clear, fast-flowing rivers with a rocky substrate. It is a generalized and opportunistic predator feeding both on fish and aquatic insects. Smaller specimens feed mostly on cobitid nemacheilid loaches and caddisflies of family Hydropsychidae, whereas larger individuals switch more towards cyprinid fishes and chironomid larvae. Triplophysa stenura is the most prevalent prey species, present in 47% of stomachs, but Schizopygopsis younghusbandi contributes most (59%) to prey weight. Insects are more important in winter and spring, and fishes in summer and autumn.

Fishery
Oxygymnocypris stewartii is heavily used as a food fish and is thought to be overfished.

References

Cyprinid fish of Asia
Freshwater fish of China
Endemic fauna of Tibet
Fish described in 1908